Barbara Kostrzewska (21 October 1915 in Jodłowa – 14 November 1986 in Warsaw) was a Polish singer and theater director. She performed from late 1930s until after the war, when she became involved in managing several theaters. During World War II she worked for Polish resistance Armia Krajowa and took part in the Warsaw Uprising. She starred in the 1951 film Warsaw Premiere.

References

1915 births
1986 deaths
People from the Kingdom of Galicia and Lodomeria
Polish Austro-Hungarians
Home Army members
Polish female soldiers
Warsaw Uprising insurgents
20th-century Polish women singers
People from Dębica County
Burials at Powązki Cemetery
Recipients of the Order of Polonia Restituta